This is a list of periodic comets that were numbered by the Minor Planet Center after having been observed on at least two occasions. Their orbital periods vary from 3.2 to 366 years.  there are 436 numbered comets (1P–436P), most of them being members of the Jupiter-family (JFC). There are also 31 Encke-type comets (ETCs), 14 Halley-type comets (HTCs), five Chiron-type comets (CTCs), and one long-period comet (153P). About a third of these bodies are also near-Earth comets (NECs). In addition, eight numbered comets are principally classified as minor planets – five main-belt comets, two centaurs (CEN), and one Apollo asteroid – and display characteristics of both an asteroid and a comet.

Occasionally, comets will break up into multiple chunks, as volatiles coming off the comet and rotational forces may cause it to break into two or more pieces. An extreme example of this is 73P/Schwassmann–Wachmann, which broke into over 50 pieces during its 1995 perihelion.

For a larger list of periodic Jupiter-family and Halley-type comets including unnumbered bodies, see list of periodic comets.

List

Multiples

51P/Harrington 
 back to main list

57P/du Toit–Neujmin–Delporte 
 back to main list

73P/Schwassmann–Wachmann 
 back to main list

In 1995, comet 73P/Schwassmann–Wachmann, broke up into several pieces and as of its last perihelion date, the pieces numbered at least 67 with 73P/Schwassmann–Wachmann C as the presumed original nucleus. Because of the enormous number, the pieces of it have been compiled into a separate list.

101P/Chernykh 
 back to main list

128P/Shoemaker–Holt 
 back to main list

141P/Machholz 
 back to main list

205P/Giacobini 
 back to main list

213P/Van Ness 
 back to main list

332P/Ikeya–Murakami 
 back to main list

See also 
 List of interstellar comets
 List of comets by type
 List of non-periodic comets
 List of periodic comets

References 
 

numbered comets